The Dallas Cowboys Radio Network is an American radio network broadcasting all Dallas Cowboys football games to stations across all of Texas, Arkansas, Oklahoma, Louisiana, and New Mexico during the NFL season. Since the 2009 NFL season, it has been an arm of Entercom (formerly CBS Radio) and comprises over 50 stations with KRLD-FM in Dallas being the flagship station. Prior to 2009, Cowboys games were broadcast on 1310 AM KTCK "The Ticket" and 93.3 FM KDBN "The Bone", and also previously on 103.7 KVIL FM and 98.7 FM KLUV "K-LUV". Beginning in the 2011 NFL season, a separate contract allows a second network to be carried nationwide through Compass Media Networks, but it is not the official Dallas Cowboys Radio Network.

Announcers

The announcers are Brad Sham with play-by-play, Babe Laufenberg with color commentary, and Kristi Scales with sideline reports.

Affiliates

Texas

Arkansas

Louisiana

New Mexico

Oklahoma

Spanish

A separate network broadcasts games in Spanish. The flagship station is KMVK 107.5 FM in Dallas. The Spanish announcers are Victor Villalba, Andres Arce and Luis Perez.

Affiliates

Texas

Oklahoma

New Mexico

Nevada

Mexico

References

National Football League on the radio
Sports radio networks in the United States